Homemade is an Italian-Chilean anthology series, following stories during the COVID-19 pandemic in the form of short films produced by filmmakers from all around the world. On June 30, 2020, it was released by Netflix on its platform.

The short-film series is scheduled to leave Netflix on December 31, 2021.

Production
In June 2020, it was announced Ladj Ly, Paolo Sorrentino,  Rachel Morrison, Pablo Larraín, Rungano Nyoni, Natalia Beristáin, Sebastian Schipper, Naomi Kawase, David Mackenzie, Maggie Gyllenhaal, Nadine Labaki, Khaled Mouzanar, Antonio Campos, Johnny Ma, Kristen Stewart, Gurinder Chadha, Sebastián Lelio and Ana Lily Amirpour would participate in an anthology short film series, with Larraín producing the series under his Fabula banner, with Netflix distributing.

Episodes

Reception
The series was released on June 30, 2020 on Netflix. On review aggregator Rotten Tomatoes, Homemade has an approval rating of 94% based on 17 reviews, with an average rating of 7.5/10. The website's critical consensus reads, "Not all of Homemades segments are created equal, but together they stand as a fascinating examination of the strength of the human spirit in turbulent times."

IndieWire described the series as "pure filmmaking talent in bite-sized pieces that doubles as a lively, scattershot collage of the world in 2020." The site also gave Homemade a rating grade of an A−. Decider Anna Menta praised the short Crickets by Kristen Stewart, describing the short as "jump cuts, not-so-great sound, existential mumblings, and a plot that’s not really a plot. Still, Stewart is an incredible actress, and you can see every micro-expression on her face in the extreme close-ups."

References

External links
 

2020 Italian television series debuts
2020 Chilean television series debuts
2020s anthology television series
Italian drama television series
Chilean drama television series
English-language Netflix original programming